The First Ichirō Hatoyama Cabinet was the 52nd Cabinet of Japan. It was headed by Ichirō Hatoyama from December 10, 1954, to March 19, 1955.

Cabinet

References 

Cabinet of Japan
1954 establishments in Japan
Cabinets established in 1954
Cabinets disestablished in 1955
1955 disestablishments in Japan